Rosalka is a 2010 Philippine drama starring Empress Schuck in the title role along with Matt Evans and Felix Roco. The series aired on ABS-CBN's Hapontastic afternoon block from May 17, 2010, to October 22, 2010, replacing Magkano ang Iyong Dangal? and was replaced by Juanita Banana.

This series was currently streaming on Jeepney TV YouTube Channel every 7:00 pm & 7:30 pm.

Plot
The story revolves around a young lady named Rosalka, judged and shunned by the public because of her "horrible" disability—all, except for a man who seems to accept her for who she is. But will their love stand the test of time—and of society, when the mystery of Rosalka's disability is made public? Rosa is carrying a monster inside her back that detaches itself every full moon which then transforms Rosa into a beautiful lady. The monster dies at the ending because of saving its and Rosa's mother from Wilfred.

Cast and characters

Main Cast
Empress Schuck as Rosa Dimaano/Sophia
Felix Roco as Jason Sta. Maria
Matt Evans as Aries Abad

Supporting cast
 Max Collins as Veronica Dominguez
 Mickey Ferriols as Cecille Dimaano
 Nikki Bacolod as Shane Balbas
 Kier Legaspi as Jhun Dimaano
 Dominic Ochoa as Wilfred Dominguez
 Bernard Palanca as Ramon Sta. Maria
 Maricar de Mesa as Cynthia Dominguez 
 Pretty Trisha as Tita Didi / Diana
 DJ Durano as Teddy Jimedez
 Arnold Reyes as Francis Tan
 Mila del Sol as Donya Carmen Sta. Maria

Extended cast
 Ian Galliguez as Juvy
 Justin Cuyugan as Johnny
 Neil Coleta as Randy
 Enrique Gil as Andrew
 Lloyd Zaragoza as Gaspar
 Paw Diaz as Lucy
 Zeppi Borromeo as Noel
 Cherry Lou as Maya
 Jayssel Lucelo as Ronnie
 Micah Muñoz as Tony
 Missy Maramara as Dixie Jimedez
 Jenny Miller as Marlene

Special participation
 Barbie Sabino as young Rosa
 Maliksi Morales as young Jason
 Martin del Rosario as young Johnny
 Ina Feleo as Christy

Launch
Rosalka was launched as one of the ABS-CBN's offerings for the 2010, during the ABS-CBN Trade Launch and was announced during the Kapamilya Trade Launch held in Boracay.

Trivia
In Slavic mythology, there is a supernatural creature called "Rusalka" which generally resemble mermaids and nymphs.

Award

 2010 PMPC Star Awards for Television's "Best Daytime-Drama Series"

See also
List of programs broadcast by ABS-CBN

References

2010 Philippine television series debuts
2010 Philippine television series endings
ABS-CBN drama series
Television series by Star Creatives
Philippine horror fiction television series
Fantaserye and telefantasya
Filipino-language television shows
Television shows set in the Philippines